Kim Ho-young (김호영, born. October 29, 1969, in South Korea) is a South Korean football manager and former player. He is currently the manager of Gwangju FC.

His name was Kim Yong-kab but he changed name to Kim Ho-young.

Club career
He played in the K League for the Ilhwa Chunma and Jeonbuk Hyundai Dinos.

Honours

External links
 

1958 births
Living people
Association football forwards
South Korean footballers
South Korean football managers
South Korean expatriate footballers
South Korea international footballers
Seongnam FC players
Jeonbuk Hyundai Motors players
Gangwon FC managers
FC Seoul managers
FC Seoul non-playing staff